Marc Alexander Rafelski is an American astrophysicist. Rafelski studied astronomy at the University of California, Los Angeles with Andrea Gehz. He obtained his PhD in physics from the University of California, San Diego, under supervision of Arthur Wolfe, in 2011.

Career 
Between 2011 and 2016 Rafelski held postdoc positions at IPAC, Caltech, and NASA Goddard, moving on to a staff position at the Space Telescope Science Institute in Baltimore in 2016. Starting in 2020, he is the branch manager for the Cosmic Origins Spectrograph (COS), a science instrument that was installed on the Hubble Space Telescope during Servicing Mission 4 (STS-125) in May 2009.

Rafelski studies the formation and evolution of galaxies by looking at the physical characteristics and processes of high redshift galaxies and their associated gas reservoirs, inflows, and outflows. He started publishing already as an undergraduate student, both in astronomy and heavy-ion physics. Since then he has co-authored more than 200 scientific papers.

Personal life 
Marc Rafelski is son of Johann and Helga Rafelski, and adoptive son of Victoria Grossack. He  is married to Lauren Anne Elmegreen Rafelski. The couple has two children and lives in Maryland.

References 

American astrophysicists
Living people
1982 births